Mavelikkara Ponnamma (died 6 September 1995) was an Indian actress in Malayalam movies. She was one of the prominent supporting actress in late 1970s and 1990s in Malayalam movies. She is noted for her performance in Ulladakkam (1991), Aakasha Kottayile Sultan (1991) and Ennodu Ishtam Koodamo (1992).

Personal life
She belongs to the Mavelikkara Palace clan in Mavelikkara, Kerala. She was married to Raghava Panicker. The couple had a daughter, Sushama Padmanabhan.

Career
She was a government school teacher by profession, but her life was drama and films. She was one of the foremost  females to start acting on stage in the 1940s when female roles were done on stage by men. She had acted in more than 500 stage dramas with renowned troupes like KPAC and Kalanilayam. She had acted with all of the top artistes of her time like Sebastian kunju kunju bhagavathar, Augustine joseph ( Singer Yesudas's father) T. N. Gopinathan Nair, Thoppil Bhasi, O Madhavan ( Actor Mukesh's father) etc.

She started acting in films in 1963 in the Udaya movies film Kadalamma in which she was the heroine and Sathyan was the hero. She acted in few other films during those days like Oru Sundariyude Katha  with Prem Nazir and Jayabharathi and few other films. However, since her job as a teacher didn't allow her to take long leaves and those days since most of the films were being shot in Madras, she discontinued acting till she retired from government service.

She returned to big screen in 1989 with the K P Kumaran directed Award-winning movie Rugmini which had the story by Madhavikutty. Later she starred in movies like Jayaraj's Akasakottayile Sultan- with Srinivasan, Kamal's Ennodishtam Koodamo- with Mukesh, Madhubhala, Kamal's Ulladakkam with Mohanlal, Shobhana etc., Siby Malayil's Lohithadas scripted Valayam with Murali, Manoj K Jayan etc., T.V Chandrans’ Ponthan Mada with Mammootty, Sasinas based on Vaikom Muhammad Basheer's life story with Asokhan, Kidilol Kidilam with Narendra Prasad, Rajan P Dev and Rekha, Thalamura with Narendra Prasad, Madhu and Anju, Pidakkozhi Koovunna Noottandu with Urvashi, Ratheesh, Vinayaprasad, Sathyan Anthikkad's Samooham with Suresh Gopi, Suhasini Manirathnam etc.

She was the recipient of the Kerala Sangeetha Nataka Akademi Award in 1962, Kerala Sangeetha Nataka Akademi Fellowship in 1993, and many other noted awards.

She died on 6 September 1995  at the Sree Uthradom thirunal hospital due to heart attack.

Partial filmography

As an actress

As a playback singer
 Priyachandra Mamachandran as	Jnaanaambika	(1940)	
 Manojnam as Jnaanaambika	(1940)	
 Maayaarasitham as Jnaanaambika	(1940)	
 Jeevitheshane as Jnaanaambika	(1940)

Television career
 Oru Poo Viriyunnu
 Cherappayi
 Lambo {telefilm}
 Manchiyam {telefilm}

Dramas
 Sthree

References

External links

Mavelikkara Ponnamma at MSI

1995 deaths
Actresses from Kerala
Actresses in Malayalam cinema
Indian film actresses
Indian women playback singers
Year of birth missing
People from Alappuzha district
Malayalam playback singers
20th-century Indian singers
20th-century Indian actresses
Singers from Kerala
20th-century Indian women singers
Film musicians from Kerala
Women musicians from Kerala
Actresses in Malayalam television
Recipients of the Kerala Sangeetha Nataka Akademi Fellowship
Recipients of the Kerala Sangeetha Nataka Akademi Award